The Madrid Deep Space Communications Complex (MDSCC), in Spanish and officially Complejo de Comunicaciones de Espacio Profundo de Madrid, is a satellite ground station located in Robledo de Chavela, Spain, and operated by the Instituto Nacional de Técnica Aeroespacial (INTA). Part of the Deep Space Network (DSN) of NASA's Jet Propulsion Laboratory (JPL), along with its two sister stations at Goldstone, California and Canberra, Australia it is used for tracking and communicating with NASA's spacecraft, particularly interplanetary missions. The DSN and the Near Space Network (NSN) are services of the NASA Space Communications and Navigation program (SCaN).

Deep Space Network

The MDSCC is part of NASA's Deep Space Network run by the Jet Propulsion Laboratory. The facility contributes to the Deep Space Network's mission to provide the vital two-way communications link that tracks and controls interplanetary spacecraft and receives the images and scientific information they collect. The complex is one of three NASA Deep Space Network complexes in the world, located at separations of approximately 120° longitude so that a spacecraft will always be in sight of at least one station; the others are the Goldstone Deep Space Communications Complex located in California, near the city of Barstow, and the Canberra Deep Space Communication Complex in Australia which is close to the city of Canberra.

The complex also serves some missions of the European Space Agency.

Functions

The antennas and data delivery systems make it possible to:

Acquire telemetry data from spacecraft.
Transmit commands to spacecraft.
Track spacecraft position and velocity.
Perform Radio Astronomy (both single-dish and very-long-baseline interferometry) observations.
Measure variations in radio waves for radio science experiments.
Monitor and control the performance of the Deep Space Network.

Antennas

The complex has eight large parabolic antennas, called DSS-61, DSS-54, DSS-55, DSS-56, DSS-63, DSS-65 and DSS-66.

See also
 Instituto Nacional de Técnica Aeroespacial (INTA)
 RT-70

References

External links

 Official Site at JPL
 Blog of the scientists manning the station
 How the station works, alone and within the DSN (interactive graphic, in Spanish)
 Official Site at ISDEFE, operator of MDSCC at Robledo

Deep Space Network
Radio telescopes
Earth stations in Spain
NASA facilities
INTA facilities
1961 establishments in Spain